In biology, the BBCH-scale for bulb vegetables describes the phenological development of bulb vegetable plants, such as onion, leek, garlic and shallot, using the BBCH-scale.

The phenological growth stages and BBCH-identification keys of bulb vegetables are:

1 Seed sown
2 Onion sets, shallot and garlic
3 For onions, garlic
4 For leek

References

 

BBCH-scale